Luciogobius is a genus of goby in the subfamily of Gobionellinae, commonly called worm gobies. It is distributed along the coast of northeastern Asia, where species can be found in Korea, China, Taiwan, and Japan. Most species occur in Japan, and several are endemic.

These gobies are unusual in appearance and habitat preference. The vertebral column is flexible and finely segmented, with many more vertebrae than most other fish in the family; they have up to 50 vertebrae, whereas most gobies have about 26. This extra-segmented spine helps Luciogobius species burrow in their common habitat, gravel beaches. Most vertebrates would have difficulty living in gravel that is constantly stirred by tidal action, but the flexibility of the bodies of Luciogobius is likely an adaptation to this environment. They also lack scales and the first dorsal fin. Two species, L. albus and L. pallidus, are cave-adapted and live in anchialine waters.

Most of the species studied spawn in the intertidal zone, but one species has been observed spawning in freshwater rivers. The eggs are generally attached to the undersides of rocks or are buried in the gravel or stone substrate.

Species
There are currently 16 recognized species in this genus. There are many more taxa known that are still undescribed, for a probable total of about 37 species.

The described species are:
 Luciogobius adapel Okiyama, 2001
 Luciogobius albus Regan, 1940
 Luciogobius ama (Snyder, 1909)
 Luciogobius brevipterus J. S. T. F. Chen, 1932
 Luciogobius dormitoris Shiogaki & Dotsu, 1976
 Luciogobius elongatus Regan, 1905
 Luciogobius fluvialis Kanagawa, Itai & Senou, 2011
 Luciogobius fonticola Kanagawa, Itai & Senou, 2011
 Luciogobius grandis R. Arai, 1970
 Luciogobius guttatus T. N. Gill, 1859 (flat-headed goby)
 Luciogobius koma (Snyder, 1909)
 Luciogobius pallidus Regan, 1940
 Luciogobius parvulus (Snyder, 1909)
 Luciogobius platycephalus Shiogaki & Dotsu, 1976
 Luciogobius ryukyuensis I. S. Chen, T. Suzuki & Senou, 2008
 Luciogobius saikaiensis Dotsu, 1957

References 

 
Gobionellinae
Taxonomy articles created by Polbot